The national flag of  the Argentine Republic is a triband, composed of three equally wide horizontal bands coloured light blue and white. There are multiple interpretations on the reasons for those colors. The flag was created by Manuel Belgrano, in line with the creation of the Cockade of Argentina, and was first raised at the city of Rosario on February 27, 1812, during the Argentine War of Independence. The National Flag Memorial was later built on the site. The First Triumvirate did not approve the use of the flag, but the Asamblea del Año XIII allowed the use of the flag as a war flag. It was the Congress of Tucumán which finally designated it as the national flag, in 1816. A yellow Sun of May was added to the center in 1818.

The full flag featuring the sun is called the Official Ceremonial Flag. The flag without the sun is considered the Ornamental Flag. While both versions are equally considered the national flag, the ornamental version must always be hoisted below the Official Ceremony Flag. In vexillological terms, the Official Ceremonial Flag is the civil, state and war flag and ensign, while the Ornamental Flag is an alternative civil flag and ensign. 
There is controversy of the true colour of the first flag between historians and the descendants of Manuel Belgrano between blue and pale blue.

It is the one of five flags that use the ratio 5:8, the others being Guatemala, Palau, Poland, and Sweden.

History

The flag of Argentina was created by Manuel Belgrano during the Argentine War of Independence. While in Rosario he noticed that both the royalist and patriotic forces were using the same colors, Spain's yellow and red. After realizing this, Belgrano created the Cockade of Argentina, which was approved by the First Triumvirate on February 18, 1812. Encouraged by this success, he created a flag of the same colors nine days later. It used the colors that were used by the Criollos during the May Revolution in 1810. However, recent research and studies would indicate that the colors were chosen from the Spanish Order of Charles III symbolizing the allegiance to the rightful, and then captive King Ferdinand VII of Spain. Most portraits about the creation or first uses of the flag show the modern design of it, but the flag of Macha, a very early design kept at the House of Freedom in Sucre, Bolivia was instead a vertical triband with two white bands and a light blue one in the middle.

The flag was first flown for soldiers to swear allegiance to it on 27 February 1812, by personnel of the Batería Libertad (Liberty Battery), by the Paraná River. On that day, Belgrano said the following words:

Belgrano dispatched a letter addressed to the First Triumvirate, informing them of the newly created flag. However, unlike with the cockade, the Triumvirate did not accept the use of the flag: policy at the time was to state that the government was ruling on behalf of King Ferdinand VII of Spain who was captive of Napoleon, whereas the creation of a flag was a clear independentist act. Thus, the triumvirate sent a warning to Belgrano not to fight under the flag, but by the time the reply had arrived, Belgrano had moved to the north, following the previous orders that requested him to strengthen the patriotic position in the Upper Peru after the defeat of Juan José Castelli at the Battle of Huaqui. Meanwhile, the flag was hoisted for the first time in Buenos Aires atop the Church of Saint Nicholas of Bari on August 23, 1812; where nowadays the Obelisk of Buenos Aires is located. Still not knowing about the Triumvirate's refusal, Belgrano raised the flag at San Salvador de Jujuy and had it blessed by the local church on the second anniversary of the May Revolution. Belgrano accepted the orders from the Triumvirate by time they arrived to Salta and ceased using the flag. As soldiers had already made oaths to the new flag, Belgrano said that he was saving it for the circumstance of a great victory. 

The First Triumvirate was later replaced by the Second Triumvirate, with a more liberal ideology, who called the Asamblea del Año XIII. Despite being one of its original goals, it did not declare independence, and so did not approve the use of a national flag either; nevertheless, the flag made by Belgrano was authorized to be used as a war flag. The first oath to the newly approved flag was on February 13, 1813, next to the Salado River, which became known as the "Río Juramento" ("Oath River"). The first battle fought with the approved flag was the Battle of Salta, a decisive patriotic victory that achieved the complete defeat of royalist Pío Tristán.

The flag would be finally declared the national flag by the Congress of Tucumán on July 20, 1816, shortly after the declaration of independence. The proposal was made by the deputy Juan José Paso and the text written by the deputy of Charcas, José Serrano. On February 25, 1818, the Congress (now working at Buenos Aires) included the Sun of May in the war flag, after the proposal of deputy Chorroarín. The sun was copied after the one that the first Argentine coin featured in 1813. It was subsequently decided to keep it as part of the regular flag afterwards, and thus the sun no longer represents war.

José de San Martín was aware of the new flag, but did not employ it during the crossing of the Andes in 1817. Being a joint operation of both Argentine and Chilean forces, he thought that a new flag would be a better idea than using either the Argentine or the Chilean flag. This led to the creation of the Flag of the Andes, used in the crossing. This flag is currently used as a provincial flag by Mendoza province.

On June 8, 1938, president Roberto Ortiz sanctioned national law no. 12,361 declaring June 20 "Flag Day", a national holiday. The date was decided as the anniversary of Belgrano's death in 1820. In 1957 the National Flag Memorial (a 10,000 m monumental complex) was inaugurated in Rosario to commemorate the creation of the flag, and the official Flag Day ceremonies have customarily been conducted in its vicinity since then.

In 1978 it was specified, among other measurements, that the Official Ceremony Flag should be 1.4 meters wide and 0.9 meters high, and that the sun must be embroidered.

According to the Decree 10,302/1944 the article 2 stated that the Official Flag of the Nation is the flag with sun, approved by the "Congress of Tucumán", reunited in Buenos Aires on 25 February 1818. The article 3 stated that the flag with the sun in its center is to be used only by the Federal and Provincial Governments; while individuals and institutions use a flag without the sun.

In 1985 the Law 23,208 repealed the article 3 of the Decree 10,302/1944, saying that the Federal and Provincial Governments, as well as individuals have the right to use the Official Flag of the Nation.

Historical flags

Design

Popular belief attributes the colors to those of the sky, clouds and the sun; some anthems to the flag like "Aurora" or "Salute to the flag" state so as well. However, historians usually disregard this idea, and attribute them to loyalty towards the House of Bourbon. 

After the May Revolution, the first times of the Argentine War of Independence, the Triumvirate claimed to be acting on behalf of the Spanish King Ferdinand VII, who was prisoner of Napoleon Bonaparte during the Peninsular War. Whether such loyalty was real or a trick to conceal independentism is a topic of dispute. The creation of a new flag with those colors would have been then a way to denote autonomy, while keeping the relations with the captive king alive.

Shape and size
From 1978, the flag's official proportions are 9:14, and its official size is 0.9 by 1.4 meters. It features three stripes alternating sky blue, white and sky blue. Each stripe is 30 centimeters high. In the center stripe there is an emblem known as the Sun of May, a golden sun. Historian Diego Abad de Santillán claimed that the Sun of May was a representation of the Inca sun god Inti.

Flags with proportions of 1:2 and 2:3 are also in use.

Colors
The colors are officially defined using the CIE 1976 standard:

The following are given for computer, textile, print and plastic use:

The Spanish word  (sky blue) is used to describe the colour of the blue stripes.

Sun of May

The sun is called the Sun of May because it is a replica of an engraving on the first Argentine coin, approved in 1813, whose value was eight escudos (one Spanish dollar). It has 16 straight and 16 waved sunbeams.

In 1978 the sun color was specified to be golden yellow, to have an inner diameter of 10 cm, and an outer diameter of 25 cm (the diameter of the sun equals  the height of the white stripe. It features 32 rays, alternately wavy and straight, and from 1978 it must be embroidered in the "Official Flag Ceremony".

Influence of the Argentine flag

The French privateer Louis-Michel Aury used the Argentine flag as a model for the blue-white-blue flag of the first independent state in Central America, which was created 1818 in Isla de Providencia, an island off the east coast of Nicaragua. This state existed until approximately 1821, before the Gran Colombia took over control of these islands. Somewhat later (1823) this flag was again used as the model for the flag of the United Provinces of Central America, a confederation of the current Central American states of Guatemala, Honduras, El Salvador, Nicaragua and Costa Rica, which existed from 1823 to 1838. After the dissolution of the Union, the five countries became independent, but even today all of these states except Costa Rica use flags of blue-white-blue stripes (the Costa Rican flag has a compound red stripe on the white one, added to incorporate all the colors of the French flag). Also the sun in the Flag of the Philippines is the Sun of May. The Argentine flag also inspired the flags of Uruguay and Paraguay.

Current flags of Central and South American countries

Anthems to the flag

Aurora (Sunrise)
{| align=top width=100%
||
Alta en el cielo, un águila guerrera
Audaz se eleva en vuelo triunfal.
Azul un ala del color del cielo,
Azul un ala del color del mar.

Así en el alta aurora irradial.
Punta de flecha el áureo rostro imita.
Y forma estela el purpurado cuello.
El ala es paño, el águila es bandera.

Es la bandera de la patria mía,
del sol nacido que me ha dado Dios. 
Es la bandera de la Patria Mía,
del sol nacido que me ha dado Dios.
||
High in the sky, a warrior eagle
rises audacious in its triumphal flight
One wing is blue, sky-colored;
one wing is blue, sea-colored.

In the high radiant aurora
its golden face resembles the tip of an arrow.
And its purple nape leaves a wake.
The wing is cloth, the eagle is a flag.

It is the flag of my Fatherland, born of the sun that God gave me.
It is the flag of my Fatherland, born of the sun that God gave me.
|}

Lyrics by Luigi Illica and Héctor Cipriano Quesada, music by Héctor Panizza, it is sung during flag raising ceremonies.

Saludo a la bandera (Salutation to the Flag)
{| align=top width=100%
||
Salve, argentina
bandera azul y blanca.
Jirón del cielo
en donde impera el Sol.
Tú, la más noble,
la más gloriosa y santa,
el firmamento su color te dio.

Yo te saludo,
bandera de mi Patria,
sublime enseña
de libertad y honor.
Jurando amarte,
como así defenderte,
mientras palpite mi fiel corazón. 
||
Hail, Argentina
blue and white flag.
Shred of the sky
where the Sun reigns.
You, the most noble,
the most glorious and holy,
the heavens gave its color to you.

I salute you,
flag of my fatherland,
sublime ensign
of freedom and honor.
Swearing to love you,
as well as to defend you,
for as long as my faithful heart beats.
|}

Mi Bandera (My Flag)
{| align=top width=100%
||
Aquí está la bandera idolatrada,
la enseña que Belgrano nos legó,
cuando triste la Patria esclavizada
con valor sus vínculos rompió.

Aquí está la bandera esplendorosa
que al mundo con sus triunfos admiró,
cuando altiva en la lucha y victoriosa
la cima de los Andes escaló.

Aquí está la bandera que un día
en la batalla tremoló triunfal
y, llena de orgullo y bizarría,
a San Lorenzo se dirigió inmortal.

Aquí está, como el cielo refulgente,
ostentando sublime majestad,
después de haber cruzado el Continente,
exclamando a su paso: ¡Libertad!
¡Libertad! ¡Libertad!
||
Here is the idolized flag,
the flag that Belgrano left to us,
when the sad enslaved Homeland
bravely broke its bonds.

Here is the splendorous flag
that surprised the world with its victory,
when arrogant and victoriously during the battles
the top of the Andes it has climbed.

Here is the flag that one day
triumphantly rose in the middle of the battle
and, full of pride and gallantry,
to San Lorenzo it went immortal.

Here it is, like the shining sky,
showing sublimate majesty
after having crossed the continent
shouting in its way: "Freedom!"
"Freedom! Freedom!"
|}

Pledge to the Flag 
As Flag Day is celebrated on June 20, the following pledge is recited to students nationwide on this day by their respective school principals or grade level advisers. In large towns where students are gathered en masse, the pledge is taken by the local town or city executive, preceded by words of advice and honor to the memory of its creator, Manuel Belgrano, using the following or similar formulas:

Variant 1 

Versions of this include references to Belgrano and to all who fought for the country during the Argentine War of Independence and other wars that followed.

Variant 2 
{| width="81%"
|
 Summons:Niños/Alumnos, esta es la Bandera que creó Manuel Belgrano en los albores de nuestra libertad, simboliza a la República Argentina, nuestra Patria.

 Es el símbolo de nuestra libre soberanía, que hace sagrados a los hombres y mujeres y a todos los pueblos del mundo. Convoca el ejercicio de nuestros deberes y nuestros derechos, a respetar las leyes y las instituciones. Es la expresión de nuestra historia forjada con la esperanza y el esfuerzo de millones de hombres y mujeres, los que nacieron en nuestra tierra y los que vinieron a poblarla al amparo de nuestra bandera y nuestra Constitución.

 Representa nuestra tierra y nuestros mares, nuestros ríos y bosques, nuestros llanos y montañas, el esfuerzo de sus habitantes, sus sueños y realizaciones. Simboliza nuestro presente, en el que, día a día, debemos construir la democracia que nos ennoblece, y conquistar el conocimiento que nos libera; y nuestro futuro, el de nuestros hijos y el de las sucesivas generaciones de argentinos.

 Niños/Alumnos, ¿prometen defenderla, respetarla y amarla, con fraterna tolerancia y respeto, estudiando con firme voluntad, comprometiéndose a ser ciudadanos libres y justos, aceptando solidariamente en sus diferencias a todos los que pueblan nuestro suelo y transmitiendo, en todos y cada uno de nuestros actos, sus valores permanentes e irrenunciables?

 Response: Sí, prometo!| valign="top" |
 Summons:Children/Students, this is the Flag that Manuel Belgrano created at the dawn of our freedom; the symbol of our fatherland, the Argentine Republic.It is the symbol of our free sovereignty, which renders sacred the men and women and all the peoples of the world. It calls on us to exercise our duties and our rights, to respect our nation's laws and institutions. It is the expression of our history forged with the hope and the efforts of millions of men and women, those who were born in our land and those who came to settle it under our flag and our Constitution. It represents our land and our seas, our rivers and forests, our plains and mountains, the efforts of its inhabitants, their dreams and achievements. It symbolizes our present, in which, day by day, we must build the democracy that ennobles us and conquer the knowledge that frees us, as well as our future, that of our children and the successive generations of Argentines.Children/Students, do you promise to defend, respect, and love it, with fraternal tolerance and respect, studying with determination, committing to be free and honest citizens, accepting in solidarity the diversity of all those who inhabit our lands, and passing on these permanent and irrevocable values in everything you do? Response: Yes, I promise! (standing to attention and extending the right arm towards the flag)
|}

The Glorious Reveille may be sounded by a military or a marching band at this point, and confetti may be showered upon the students.

In the Armed Forces of the Argentine Republic and civil uniformed services the pledge is similar but with a different formula and response of ¡Si, juro! (Yes, I pledge!'')

Military/police variant 

In the Argentine Federal Police, the words  (and its Constitution) may be inserted.

See also

List of Argentine flags
Spanish fess
Flag of El Salvador
Flag of Honduras
Flag of Nicaragua

References

External links
 
 
 All anthems to the Argentine flag
 More information 
 Día de la Bandera  

Symbols introduced in the 1810s
National symbols of Argentina
 
1812 introductions
Argentina
Argentine culture